Richard Michael McGeagh (March 11, 1944September 9, 2021) was an American competition swimmer and water polo player in his youth, and later a real estate appraiser.  He was best known for swimming the backstroke leg for the U.S. team in the preliminary heats of the men's 4×100-meter medley relay at the 1964 Summer Olympics in Tokyo, and establishing the Olympic record for a backstroke leg.  The U.S. team won its preliminary heat and also won the event final, but McGeagh did not swim in the finals and was consequently not eligible for an Olympic medal under the rules in place at the time.

Early life
McGeagh was born in Los Angeles on March 11, 1944.  He attended Herbert Hoover High School in Glendale, where he won the 100-yard backstroke event at the CIF Southern Section championships three consecutive times from 1960 to 1962.  He also established the national high school record for that event in 1961, with a time of 51.8 seconds.  He went on to study at the University of Southern California from 1962 to 1967.  He was involved in swimming and water polo for the USC Trojans and received All-American honors in both sports.  He won the 400-yard individual medley at the 1964 NCAA championships during his sophomore year.

Career
McGeagh participated in the 1963 Pan American Games, winning a gold medal in the 4×100 m medley relay.  He was also part of the American team that established the long course world record of 4:00.1 in the same event at a meet in Osaka that year.  He took a semester off in order to get ready for the 1964 Summer Olympics in Tokyo.  He was selected to compete in the preliminary heats of the men's 4×100 m medley relay.  Although McGeagh, Virgil Luken, Walter Richardson, and Bob Bennett were described by the Associated Press as "a second‐string team", they established an Olympic record of 4:05.1.  McGeagh's time of 1:01.1 was also an Olympic record for the backstroke leg of the relay.  He was ultimately omitted from the medal round and was consequently not awarded a medal.  This was because under the 1964 Olympic swimming rules, only swimmers who competed in the event final were eligible to receive a medal.

Personal life and death
McGeagh was married to Barbara for 55 years until his death.  Together, they had two children: Michael and Karin.

After retiring from competitive swimming, McGeagh became a real estate appraiser.  He initially resided in La Crescenta-Montrose, California, before moving to the Nashville neighborhood of  Hermitage, Tennessee, in 2013. He died of complications from COVID-19 in Hermitage on September 9, 2021, at the age of 77, during the COVID-19 pandemic in Tennessee.

See also
 List of University of Southern California people
 World record progression 4 × 100 metres medley relay

References

1944 births
2021 deaths
American male backstroke swimmers
World record setters in swimming
Olympic swimmers of the United States
Swimmers from Los Angeles
Swimmers at the 1963 Pan American Games
Swimmers at the 1964 Summer Olympics
USC Trojans men's swimmers
Pan American Games gold medalists for the United States
Pan American Games medalists in swimming
Medalists at the 1963 Pan American Games
Deaths from the COVID-19 pandemic in Tennessee